Leonardo Gassmann (born 22 November 1998), known as Leo Gassmann, is an Italian singer and songwriter.

Biography 
Born in Rome, he is the son of the actors Alessandro Gassmann and Sabrina Knaflitz and the grandson of the actors Vittorio Gassman and Juliette Mayniel.

In 2018 he participated at the twelfth edition of the Italian X Factor; he ended up fifth and released his debut single "Piume".

Gassmann competed and won at the "Newcomers" section of the Sanremo Music Festival 2020 with the song "Vai bene così". His first studio album Strike was released on 7 February 2020.

On 4 December 2022, it was officially announced his participation in the Sanremo Music Festival 2023. "Terzo cuore" was later announced as his entry.

Discography

Studio albums

Singles

References

External links

1998 births
Living people
Italian people of Jewish descent
Italian pop singers
21st-century Italian male  singers
Sanremo Music Festival winners of the newcomers section